Çiriştepe is a village in Tarsus district of Mersin Province, Turkey. It is situated in Çukurova (Cilicia of antiquity) to the east of Tarsus and between Turkish motorway O-31 and Turkish state highway D.750. Çiriştepe is also a stop on railroad. The population of Çiriştepe was 196 as of 2011.

References

Villages in Tarsus District